Ramata-Toulaye Sy is a Senegalese-French film director and screenwriter. She is most noted for her 2021 short film Astel, which was the winner of the Share Her Journey award at the 2021 Toronto International Film Festival, and the SACD Award and a Special Jury Prize at the 2022 Clermont-Ferrand International Short Film Festival.

She was a cowriter of the feature films Sibel and Our Lady of the Nile (Notre-Dame-du-Nil), before making Astel as her first directorial project.

Her feature debut, Banel & Adama, entered production in 2022.

References

External links

French film directors
21st-century French screenwriters
French women film directors
French women screenwriters
Senegalese film directors
Senegalese screenwriters
Senegalese women film directors
Senegalese women writers
Living people
Year of birth missing (living people)